James Wroughton was the member of Parliament for the constituency of Cirencester for the parliament of 1597.

References 

English MPs 1597–1598
Members of Parliament for Cirencester
Year of birth unknown
Year of death unknown